And Into Heaven Came the Night is Lincoln Durham's fourth studio album, released on March 30, 2018 on Droog Records. Durham uses an array of instruments for the album, including guitar, cigar box guitar, pump organ, fiddle, and sheet metal. Most of the music on the album is generated by Durham, but he uses Chris Hausler for drums and mini Marvin on some of the tracks, and his wife Alissa provides some backing vocals.

Durham states about this album:

Track list

References

2018 albums
Lincoln Durham albums